Feng Guixin (born 11 February 1982 in Chaoyang, Liaoning) is a female Chinese rower, who was to compete for Team China at the 2008 Summer Olympics in the women's quadruple sculls event. However, she was later replaced by Zhang Yangyang, and did not compete; the reconstituted team went on to win gold.

Major performances

2005 National Games – 1st double sculls;
2007 World Championships – 3rd quadruple sculls;
2008 World Cup Lucerne – 1st quadruple sculls

References

1982 births
Living people
Chinese female rowers
Olympic rowers of China
Rowers from Liaoning
People from Chaoyang, Liaoning
World Rowing Championships medalists for China
20th-century Chinese women
21st-century Chinese women